Mülsen is a municipality in Germany, Landkreis Zwickau in Saxony. It is situated 6 km northeast of Zwickau.

References

External links 

 Mülsen Notgeld (emergency banknotes) from the town of Mülsen depicting the effects of heavy drinking on a friendship http://webgerman.com/Notgeld/Directory/M/Muelsen.htm

Zwickau (district)